The 224th Center for Electronic Action is unit of the Serbian Armed Forces directly subordinated to the Intelligence and Reconnaissance Directorate (J-2) of the General Staff. The main duty of the Center is to plan, organize and conduct all aspects of electronic warfare.

Structure
The 224th Center for Electronic Action consists of command platoon and 2 battalions:

 Command platoon
 1st Electronic Warfare Battalion
 2nd Electronic Warfare Battalion

Gallery

References 

Serbian General Staff
Electronic warfare units and formations